Antonija Panda (12 March 1977 in Subotica) is a Serbian sprint canoeist who has competed since mid-2000s. She won a bronze medal in the K-4 200 m event at the 2007 ICF Canoe Sprint World Championships in Duisburg.

References

Living people
Serbian female canoeists
1977 births
Olympic canoeists of Serbia
Canoeists at the 2012 Summer Olympics
Sportspeople from Subotica
ICF Canoe Sprint World Championships medalists in kayak